Irnik Point (Named after one of Attila's son, Ernak.)(‘Nos Irnik’ \'nos ir-'nik\) is the ice-free southwest entrance point to Brauro Cove on the northwest coast of Snow Island in the South Shetland Islands, Antarctica. It is situated 3.5 km southwest of Cape Timblón, 2 km southwest of Mezdra Point, and 7.4 km northeast of Byewater Point.

The point is named after the legendary Khan Irnik listed in the 8th Century ‘Nominalia of the Bulgarian Khans’.

Location
British mapping in 1968, Bulgarian in 2009.

Map
 L.L. Ivanov. Antarctica: Livingston Island and Greenwich, Robert, Snow and Smith Islands. Scale 1:120000 topographic map.  Troyan: Manfred Wörner Foundation, 2009.  
 Antarctic Digital Database (ADD). Scale 1:250000 topographic map of Antarctica. Scientific Committee on Antarctic Research (SCAR). Since 1993, regularly upgraded and updated.
 L.L. Ivanov. Antarctica: Livingston Island and Smith Island. Scale 1:100000 topographic map. Manfred Wörner Foundation, 2017.

References
 Irnik Point. SCAR Composite Gazetteer of Antarctica.
 Bulgarian Antarctic Gazetteer. Antarctic Place-names Commission. (details in Bulgarian, basic data in English)

External links
 Irnik Point. Copernix satellite image

Headlands of the South Shetland Islands
Bulgaria and the Antarctic